The 2015 Spanish Athletics Championships was the 95th edition of the national championship in outdoor track and field for Spain. It was held on 1 and 2 August at the Pista Municipal Gaetá Huguet in Castellón de la Plana. It served as the selection meeting for Spain at the 2015 World Championships in Athletics.

The club championships in relays and combined track and field events were contested separately from the main competition.

Results

Men

Women

References

Results
XCV Campeonato de España Absoluto . Royal Spanish Athletics Federation. Retrieved 2019-06-29.

External links 
 Official website of the Royal Spanish Athletics Federation 

2015
Spanish Athletics Championships
Spanish Championships
Athletics Championships
Sport in Castellón de la Plana